Baniaganti S.N. Academy School and College is a large school and college of Belkuchi, Sirajgonj. The school branch was established in 1947 and the college branch in 1999. Presently, 1000+ students study in school branch and 300+ students study in college branch. The Academy Group is Arts, business studies and science group in college.

References

External links
 Education Board   Rajshahi 
 Education Boards of Bangladesh
 Directorate of Secondary and Higher Education in Bangladesh

Education in Sirajgonj
Private colleges in Bangladesh